Jabbar Abd ol Emam (also Romanized as Jabbār ‘Abd ol Emām; also known as ‘Abd ol Emām) is a village in Jazireh-ye Minu Rural District, Minu District, Khorramshahr County, Khuzestan Province, Iran. At the 2006 census, its population was 948, in 213 families.

References 

Populated places in Khorramshahr County